The Alchemical Mass/Suite Solutio is a live album by The Jeff Kaiser Ockodektet with The Ojai Camerata, and The Kaiser/Diaz-Infante Sextet, released in 2004  by pfMENTUM.

Track listing

Credits 
Acoustic Guitar [Prepared] – Ernesto Diaz-Infante
bass – Jim Connolly
Conductor – Dr. Wyant Morton (tracks: 1 to 6), Jeff Kaiser (tracks: 1 to 6)
Design, Layout, Composed By, Arranged By – Jeff Kaiser
Drums – Richie West
Ensemble – The Ojai Camerata (tracks: 1 to 6)
Flugelhorn – Jeff Kaiser (tracks: 1 to 6)
Mixed By, Mastered By – Jeff Kaiser (tracks: 7 to 11)
Percussion – Brad Dutz
Photography – Michael Kelly
Recorded By – Jeff Evans (2) (tracks: 7 to 11)
Recorded By, Mixed By, Mastered By – Wayne Peet (tracks: 1 to 6)
Trombone – Michael Vlatkovich (tracks: 1 to 6), Scot Ray (tracks: 7 to 11)
Trumpet, Flugelhorn – Jeff Kaiser (tracks: 7 to 11), Kris Tiner (tracks: 1 to 6)
Tuba – Mark Weaver
Voice [Alto] – Gwen Erickson (tracks: 1 to 6), Holly Mitchem (tracks: 1 to 6), Katherine Halsey (tracks: 1 to 6), Lisa Gordon (tracks: 1 to 6), Zoe Pietrycha (tracks: 1 to 6)
Voice [Bass] – Bill Wagner (tracks: 1 to 6), Dave Farber (tracks: 1 to 6), Jim Halverson (tracks: 1 to 6), Kurt Meyer (tracks: 1 to 6)
Voice [Soprano] – Candace Delbo (tracks: 1 to 6), Diane Besocke (tracks: 1 to 6), Eleanor Land (tracks: 1 to 6), Laura Johnson-Bickford (tracks: 1 to 6), Lu Setnicka (tracks: 1 to 6)
Voice [Tenor] – Carla Aiello (tracks: 1 to 6), J.B. White (tracks: 1 to 6), Jaye Hersh (tracks: 1 to 6)
Wind [Wood] – Eric Barber (tracks: 1 to 6), Jason Mears (tracks: 1 to 6), Vinny Golia (tracks: 1 to 6)

Notes 

The Alchemical Mass was recorded 4.26.03 at the First United Methodist Church in Ventura, CA

Suite Solutio was recorded 2.25.01 at Zircon Skye in Ojai, CA

References 

2004 albums
Avant-garde jazz albums